Kalayanthani is a small town in Thodupuzha Taluk. It lies in the Idukki district of Kerala, India. The village is 9 km east of Thodupuzha, on the Velliyamattom route.

Kalayanthani is the meeting point of the Alakode and Velliamattom village Panchayats.

The main public establishments of Kalayanthani are St. Mary's Catholic Church (1920), the famous Muslim Mosque Konthalapally, St. George's High School., Yugasilpi Arts and Sports Club and Viswadeepthi library.

Kalayanthani is known as the 'Land of Art'. Inspector General of Police Tomin Thachankary, well known lyricist Baby John Kalayanthani, popular novelist, cartoonist and freelance journalist Ignatious Kalayanthani, famous artist and playwright Skylark (K.O. Varkey) and senior Journalist Roy Mathew Pallickamyalil and Joe Joseph Lijo were all born in Kalayanthani.

A post office, a branch of Union bank, Urban Bank, Alakode service Cooperative Bank, and a primary health center are the main public institutions in Kalayanthani.

The main public establishments of Kalayanthani are St. Mary's Catholic Church (1920), the famous Muslim Mosque Konthalapally, St. George's High School., Yugasilpi Arts and Sports Club and Viswadeepthi library. It is a very small town having only a few hotels, textile shops, stationary shops, provision shops, and hardware shops. It is the Junction of two roads: one to Chilavu and the other to Vettimattam.

The famous oil palm plantation (Ennappanathottam) of Agriculture Department is located at Vettimattam, which is two kilometers away from the town of Kalayanthani.

Name 
The name 'Kalayanthani' might have come from two words, 'Kalayam' and 'Thanni' (the Malayalam name of two species of trees). There is another version which defines the word 'Kalayam' as 'Kalaham' (quarrel) and 'Thanni' as 'Thanne'.

Demographics 
Malayalam is the Local Language here.

Religion 
Kalayanthani has all communities (Christians, Hindus, Muslims) but Christianity takes the lead.

Education

Kalayanthani has a high school (St. George's high school), managed by the Kothamangalam catholic diocese and headed by the senior most teacher as Headmaster, which is really a benefit to the nearby villages.

Transport

Economy and Infrastructure 
Most of the people in Kalayanthani are farmers. They farm Rubber, Rice, Pepper, Ginger etc. 90% of the population are from middle-class families. There are number of people working abroad as Nurse, Engineer, Technicians, govt employees.

Villages in Idukki district